The Summer 2022 European Tour was a concert tour by English rock guitarist and singer Eric Clapton. The tour started on 7 May 2022 in London and ended on 17 June 2022 in Tampere.

Clapton performed in nine different European countries, including Austria, Belgium, the Czech Republic, Denmark, Finland, Germany, Italy, the Netherlands, Switzerland and the United Kingdom. Originally scheduled to take place in the summer of 2020, it was announced that the tour was to be postponed until 2022 as a result of the COVID-19 pandemic. Because of the Russo-Ukrainian War, all concerts in Russia were cancelled on February 21, 2022.

Tour dates

References 

2022 concert tours
Eric Clapton
Concert tours postponed due to the COVID-19 pandemic